is a Japanese politician of the Democratic Party of Japan, a member of the House of Representatives in the Diet (national legislature).

Overviews 

A native of Nakano, Nagano and graduate of Kyoto University, he joined the Ministry of Agriculture, Forestry and Fisheries. While in the ministry, he received a L.L.M degree from University of Washington and attended the Kansas State University in the United States. Leaving the ministry, he was elected to the House of Representatives for the first time in 2003.

References

External links 
  in Japanese.

Living people
People from Nagano (city)
Kyoto University alumni
Members of the House of Representatives (Japan)
1948 births
Democratic Party of Japan politicians
21st-century Japanese politicians